The 1982–83 United Counties League season was the 76th in the history of the United Counties League, a football competition in England.

Premier Division

The Premier Division featured 16 clubs which competed in the division last season, along with two new clubs:
Arlesey Town, transferred from the South Midlands League
Newport Pagnell Town, promoted from Division One

League table

Division One

Division One featured 14 clubs which competed in the division last season, along with two new clubs, relegated from the Premier Division:
British Timken Duston
St Neots Town

League table

References

External links
 United Counties League

1982–83 in English football leagues
United Counties League seasons